Samantha Jane Holdsworth is a medical physicist from New Zealand. She is a lecturer in medical imaging at the University of Auckland, and a principal investigator at the Centre for Brain Research.

Biography 
Holdsworth was born and grew up on a family farm near the small town of Te Karaka, near Gisborne, New Zealand. She initially studied engineering at the University of Canterbury in Christchurch, but changed to physics and completed an honours degree in the subject. She then moved to Australia and completed a master's degree at Queensland University of Technology, followed by a doctorate at the University of Queensland, in medical physics.

Following graduation, she moved to the United States and worked in the Radiological Sciences Laboratory at Stanford University's Lucas Centre.  In 2018 she returned to New Zealand and was appointed a senior lecturer at the University of Auckland, based in the Centre for Advanced MRI (CAMRI). She also returned to her hometown of Gisborne and has established a medical imaging research and innovation centre there to use medical imagining technology and research to improve the health and wellbeing of people, particularly Māori, in the region.

Holdsworth's research has led to improvements in MRI methodologies, including improvements to the resolution, speed and motion-robustness of MRI. These methods have in turn led to better detection of brain injury, stroke and neurodegenerative disease.

Personal life 
Holdsworth is the daughter of businesswoman Bronwen Holdsworth.

References

Living people
Year of birth missing (living people)
21st-century New Zealand scientists
University of Canterbury alumni
Medical physicists
Academic staff of the University of Auckland
Queensland University of Technology alumni
University of Queensland alumni
People from the Gisborne District